The Shape of a City is a 1985 book by the French writer Julien Gracq. It is a portrait of Nantes, the city where Gracq grew up, in the form of memories, anecdotes, reflections and dreamlike descriptions. The title comes from a quotation by Charles Baudelaire: "The shape of a city, as we all know, changes more quickly than the mortal heart". An English translation by Ingeborg M. Kohn was published in 2005.

Reception
In 2007, Thomas McGonigle described the book for Los Angeles Times as "a model for how to write about one’s home place[.] ... It should be required reading for anyone setting out to describe their home place."

References

External links
 The Shape of a City at the American publisher's website
 The Shape of a City at the French publisher's website 

1985 non-fiction books
Books about cities
Books about France
French non-fiction books
French-language books
Nantes
Works by Julien Gracq